The Iran national under-17 football team, more commonly known as Nojavanan, is controlled by the Iran Football Federation and represents Iran in international under-17 football competitions.

Tournament records

FIFA U-17 World Cup

AFC U-16 Championship

*Denotes draws including knockout matches decided on penalty kicks.**Red border color indicates tournament was held on home soil.

WAFF U-16 Championship

*Red border color indicates tournament was held on home soil.

CAFA U-16 Championship

Results and fixtures

Previous matches

Forthcoming matches

Coaching staff

Players

Current squad
The following 21 players were called up for 2017 FIFA U-17 World Cup.

|}

Previous squads

FIFA U-17 World Cups
FIFA U-17 World Championship 2001 squad
FIFA U-17 World Cup 2009 squad
FIFA U-17 World Cup 2013 squad
FIFA U-17 World Cup 2017 squad

See also
Iran national football team
Iran national under-23 football team
Iran national under-20 football team

References

Under-17
Asian national under-17 association football teams